Dubiraphia is a genus of riffle beetles in the family Elmidae. There are about 11 described species in Dubiraphia.

Species
 Dubiraphia bivittata (Leconte, 1852)
 Dubiraphia brevipennis Hilsenhoff, 1973
 Dubiraphia browni Hilsenhoff, 1973
 Dubiraphia brunnescens (Fall, 1925) (brownish dubiraphian riffle beetle)
 Dubiraphia giulianii (Van Dyke, 1949) (Giuliani's dubiraphian riffle beetle)
 Dubiraphia harleyi Barr, 1984
 Dubiraphia minima Hilsenhoff, 1973
 Dubiraphia parva Hilsenhoff, 1973 (little dubiraphian riffle beetle)
 Dubiraphia quadrinotata (Say, 1825)
 Dubiraphia robusta Hilsenhoff, 1973
 Dubiraphia vittata (Melsheimer, 1844)

References

Further reading

 
 
 
 
 
 
 
 
 

Elmidae